Albrecht Schöne (born 17 July 1925) is a German Germanist. From 1960 to 1990 he was a professor of German philology at the University of Göttingen.

Career
Schöne was born on 17 July 1925 in Barby an der Elbe. After graduating from secondary school he immediately performed his military service. During World War II he was made prisoner of war. Schöne subsequently worked as a lumberjack until 1947. From 1947 to 1951 he studied German literature, history, philosophy, theology and psychiatry at the universities of Freiburg, Basel, Göttingen and Münster. In 1952 Schöne took his Ph.D. from the University of Münster. In 1953 he took a position as research assistant at the Department of German Philology at the University of Göttingen. He performed his habilitation in 1957. In 1958 he became associate professor of modern German philology at the University of Münster. In 1960 he became full professor of German philology. He held visiting professorships at universities in Israel, Japan and Poland. Schöne retired in 1990.

Research
The research of Schöne has focused on the Baroque era, the Age of Enlightenment and the 20th-century. In his work he has combined philology with theology, art history and the natural sciences. He has written with new insights on Johann Wolfgang von Goethe and Georg Christoph Lichtenberg.

Awards and honours
Schöne became a member of the Göttingen Academy of Sciences and Humanities in 1966. In 1980 he became a member of the Deutsche Akademie für Sprache und Dichtung. He was elected a corresponding member (living abroad) of the Austrian Academy of Sciences in 1982. The same year he was also appointed corresponding member of the Bavarian Academy of Sciences and Humanities. In 1983 Schöne won the Johann-Heinrich-Merck-Preis of the Deutsche Akademie für Sprache und Dichtung. Schöne was elected a foreign member of the Royal Netherlands Academy of Arts and Sciences in 1985. In 1987 he became a corresponding member of the North Rhine-Westphalian Academy of Sciences, Humanities and the Arts.

In 1990 Schöne received the Orden Pour le Mérite für Wissenschaften und Künste. In 1991 he won the Carl Zuckmayer Medal. He became an international honorary member of the American Academy of Arts and Sciences in 1992. On 24 August of the same year he was awarded the Knight Commander's Cross in the Order of Merit of the Federal Republic of Germany. Schöne was awarded the Austrian Decoration for Science and Art in 1993.

He became an honorary member of the Göttingen Academy of Sciences and Humanities in 2016. Schöne won the 2017 Einhard-Preis.

References

1925 births
Living people
Corresponding Members of the Austrian Academy of Sciences
Fellows of the American Academy of Arts and Sciences
Germanists
Germanic studies scholars
Knights Commander of the Order of Merit of the Federal Republic of Germany
Members of the German Academy for Language and Literature
Members of the Royal Netherlands Academy of Arts and Sciences
People from Barby, Germany
Recipients of the Austrian Decoration for Science and Art
Recipients of the Pour le Mérite (civil class)
Academic staff of the University of Göttingen
University of Münster alumni
Academic staff of the University of Münster
German prisoners of war in World War II